I-Feel-Like-I'm-Fixin'-to-Die is the second studio album by the influential San Francisco psychedelic rock band, Country Joe and the Fish, released in 1967. Recordings took place in Vanguard studios in 71 West 23rd Street, New York City. The title track remains one of the most popular Vietnam protest songs from the 1960s and originally appeared on a 1965 7-inch EP titled Rag Baby: Songs of Opposition. On the album, "I-Feel-Like-I'm-Fixin'-to-Die Rag" appears following "The Fish Cheer", which at concerts became a Country Joe standard. At Woodstock, Joe had the crowd yell F-U-C-K instead of F-I-S-H. Another musical highlight is the track "Janis" written for McDonald's then-girlfriend Janis Joplin. It is the second song written for a female musician for their albums, the other being "Grace". Two singles were released in the wake of the album. These include "Janis"/"Janis (instrumental)" and "Who Am I"/"Thursday".

The second album was released just seven months after the debut and is another prime example of the band's psychedelic experimentation. It again features organ-heavy psychedelia and Eastern melodic lines and more acoustic guitar than their debut production. During this time, the band continued to build on their growing fame by performing at local venues like the Fillmore Auditorium. Despite the familiarity of the opening track, the album itself sold less than its predecessor. The album, as a whole, fit well in the psychedelic scene of San Francisco. The band effectively used satirical humor to express their outspoken views toward the Vietnam War and other hot topics of the counterculture. Although the rest of the tracks were not as popular, they still were accessible and showcased Country Joe McDonald as a lead vocalist. With the creativity of the band reaching a climax, the band began touring nationally and became positively regarded for their live light shows.

The title song faced a legal challenge from the estate of New Orleans jazz trombone pioneer Edward "Kid" Ory, whose daughter Babette claimed that McDonald had appropriated the melody for his song from Ory's classic "Muskrat Ramble" as recorded by Louis Armstrong & his Hot Five in 1926. A 2005 judgment upheld McDonald's copyright on the song, claiming that Ory had waited too long to make the claim.

The original album sleeve contained a poster for "The Fish Game", a huge 22 x 33-inch fold-out board game sheet for throwing a dice and moving five band-member cut-out paper pieces around on. Various goals are available for the game such as "scoring a joint".

The 2013 digi pack double disc set includes both the Stereo and Mono version of the album, the latter available for the first time since 1967.  Bonus cuts include an unreleased alternate mix of the title track (minus sound effects), an instrumental version of "Janis," both on the Mono disc, and a deluxe 40-page booklet stuffed with rare photos and memorabilia.  It also comes complete with a replica of the Fish Game, as included in original LPs.

Track listing
All songs by Country Joe McDonald, except where noted. "Janis" is the first song on side two of the original LP.

"The "Fish" Cheer/I-Feel-Like-I'm-Fixin'-to-Die Rag" – 3:44
"Who Am I" – 4:05
"Pat's Song" – 5:26
"Rock Coast Blues" – 3:57
"Magoo" – 4:44
"Janis" – 2:36
"Thought Dream" – 6:39
"Thursday"  (Cohen, Hirsh) – 3:20
"Eastern Jam" (Barthol, Cohen, Hirsh, Melton) – 4:27
"Colors for Susan" – 5:58

The 2013 digi pack double disc set includes two bonus cuts added to the mono disc.
"Janis" (Instrumental) - 2:37
"I Feel Like I'm Fixin' to Die" (Alternative Mix) - 3:02

Personnel
Country Joe and the Fish
 Country Joe McDonald – vocals (tracks 1-8), acoustic guitar (tracks 2, 5, 6, 10), rhythm guitar (tracks 3, 7), organ (track 8)
 Barry Melton – 12-string guitar (track 1), vocals (tracks 1, 5), kazoo (track 1), rhythm guitar (tracks 2, 4, 5), lead guitar (tracks 3, 4, 6-9)
 David Cohen - calliope (tracks 1, 6), vocals (track 1), lead guitar (tracks 2, 5, 9, 10), organ (tracks 3, 7), bells (track 3), rhythm guitar (track 4), harpsichord (track 6), acoustic guitar (track 8)
 Bruce Barthol – bass; vocals (track 1), barking (track 1), harmonica (track 6)
 Gary "Chicken" Hirsh - drums; wine bottle (track 1), congas (track 9), bells (track 10)

References

I-Feel-Like-I'm-Fixin'-to-Die
I-Feel-Like-I'm-Fixin'-to-Die
Country Joe and the Fish albums
Albums produced by Samuel Charters